Lent Cottage is a historic apartment house built as a cure cottage located at Saranac Lake, town of North Elba in Essex County, New York.  It was built about 1920 and is a -story, wood frame, side-gabled structure with two hipped-roofed wings extending from the principal facade.  It is in the Colonial Revival style.  Each two bedroom apartment features a 9 feet by 13 feet cure porch and the property includes a flagstone patio.  It was once operated as a tubercular sanatorium.

It was listed on the National Register of Historic Places in 1992. It is located in the Helen Hill Historic District.

References

Residential buildings on the National Register of Historic Places in New York (state)
Colonial Revival architecture in New York (state)
Residential buildings completed in 1920
Buildings and structures in Essex County, New York
National Register of Historic Places in Essex County, New York
Individually listed contributing properties to historic districts on the National Register in New York (state)